HMS Oribi (G66)  was an O-class destroyer of the Royal Navy. Following the style of her sister ships she was named with a word beginning with O.  Originally, she was to have been named HMS Observer, but because her building was sponsored by the South African government she was christened HMS Oribi, after the oribi, a South African antelope. In 1942, after a successful warship week, the ship was "adopted" by Havant, Hampshire.

Second World War service

Oribi was one of the destroyers that supported Operation Archery, the November 1941 commando raid on Norway, by shelling the islands and attacking German shipping in the sheltered anchorage. She also assisted to bring Norwegian nationals home after the raid to escape the German occupation.

She saw extensive action during the Arctic and North Atlantic convoys of the Second World War. These included Convoy ONS 5 in May 1943, regarded as the turning point of the Battle of the Atlantic. At 03:00 on 6 May 1943 U-125 was located by radar in thick fog, rammed by HMS Oribi and disabled, she was unable to dive. The captain of Snowflake signalled the Senior Officer Escort, Lieutenant Commander Robert Sherwood, proposing to pick them up, and received the response: "Not approved to pick up survivors." Snowflake and Sunflower thereupon resumed their positions around the convoy, while the crew of U-125 died in the Atlantic over the next few hours.

Postwar service
Oribi was transferred to the Turkish Navy in 1946 and renamed Gayret, to replace a previous ship of that name requisitioned by the Royal Navy during the Second World War and lost during hostilities. She received the new pennant number D15 and was used as a headquarters ship.

Notes

References
 
 
 
 
 
 
 
 

 

O and P-class destroyers
Ships built in Govan
1941 ships
World War II destroyers of the United Kingdom
O-class destroyers of the Turkish Navy